Clairvilliops is a genus of flies in the family Tachinidae.

Species
C. breviforceps van Emden, 1954

References

Phasiinae
Diptera of Asia
Tachinidae genera